The Roman Catholic Diocese of Iringa is a diocese located in Iringa in the Ecclesiastical province of Mbeya in Tanzania.

History
 March 3, 1922: Established as Apostolic Prefecture of Iringa from the Apostolic Vicariate of Dar-es-Salaam
 January 8, 1948: Promoted as Apostolic Vicariate of Iringa
 March 25, 1953: Promoted as Diocese of Iringa
 December 21, 2018: Changed metropolia from Songea to Mbeya

Leadership
 Prefects Apostolic of Iringa (Roman rite)
 Fr. Francesco Cagliero, I.C.M. (1922.05.10 – 1935)
 Fr. Attilio Beltramino, I.C.M. (1936.02.18 – 1948.01.08 see below)
 Vicar Apostolic of Iringa (Roman rite) 
 Bishop Attilio Beltramino, I.C.M. (see above 1948.01.08 – 1953.03.25 see below)
 Bishops of Iringa (Roman rite)
 Bishop Attilio Beltramino, I.C.M. (see above 1953.03.25 – 1965.10.03)
 Bishop Mario Epifanio Abdallah Mgulunde (1969.10.23 – 1985.03.09), appointed Archbishop of Tabora 
 Bishop Norbert Wendelin Mtega (1985.10.28 – 1992.07.06), appointed Archbishop of Songea 
 Bishop Tarcisius Ngalalekumtwa (since 1992.11.21)

See also
Roman Catholicism in Tanzania

Sources
 GCatholic.org
 Catholic Hierarchy

Iringa
Christian organizations established in 1922
Roman Catholic dioceses and prelatures established in the 20th century
Iringa, Roman Catholic Diocese of